Sergey Anatolyevich Romanov, born 20 September 1958, is a Russian scientist, internal dosimetry and radiation protection specialist, PhD in biology (2003). He is the author and coauthor of more than 150 research papers.

Education and early life 
Sergey Romanov was born on 20 September 1958 in Buran village in Markakolsky district of East Kazakhstan Region, Kazakh SSR, USSR, to the Romanov family, Anatoly Mikhailovich and Maria Timofeevna. In 1969 his family had moved to Kimry, Tver oblast, where he graduated from a high school and that year entered the Faculty of Applied Mathematics at Sergo Ordzhonikidze Moscow Aviation Institute (MAI).

Career and research 
In 1982, he graduated from MAI majoring in Applied Mathematics. He began his career as an engineer at the machine-construction design office “Raduga” in Dubna, Moscow oblast. By the end of 1985 he had moved to Ozyorsk where he had started his career at one of the biggest USSR nuclear facilities Mayak PA as a control and testing instrumentation mechanic; six months later he had moved to the Internal Dosimetry Laboratory of the Branch #1 of Biophysics Institute. He worked as a senior laboratory assistant (1986), then as a senior engineer, the 1st category engineer, a leading programming engineer, the head of the group, he was eventually appointed as Director of the Branch (since 1997).

Member of the Russian delegation and expert in the United Nations Scientific Committee on the Effects of Atomic Radiation (UNSCEAR) (since 2008), member of the Main Commission of the International Commission on Radiological Protection (since 2013 ), member of the Russian Scientific Commission on Radiological Protection. Expert of the Federal Target Program “Providing nuclear and radiation safety for 2016-2020 and for the period up to 2030” (FTP NRS-2). He is the member of the editorial board of Radiation and Environmental Biophysics, "Radiation Safety Issues", "Emergency medicine".

From 2004 to 2012 he taught at South Ural State University (Ozyorsk Branch) as head of Biophysics special Chair.

Sergey Romanov has the rank of senior international master, SIM (2000)  in correspondence chess.

h-index 
His h-index in the International bibliographic and reference database Scopus as of 25.02.2022 reaches 19.

Awards and honours 
Sergey Romanov is the recipient of the 2002  , awarded the II Degree Medal of the Order "For Merit to the Fatherland" (2010).

Personal life 
He lives in Ozersk, Chelyabinsk oblast, Russia. Married.

Publications 
Some of the most cited publications:

2010s

2020s

References 

Russian biophysicists
Russian biologists
Radiobiologists
Kazakhstani people of Russian descent
1958 births
Living people
Academic staff of South Ural State University